Houshang Beheshti (also Romanized as Hushang Beheshti; 1923, Tehran – 1991, Tehran) was an Iranian actor.

Filmography

Cinema
 Fighting with Evil - 1953
 Returning to Life  - 1957
 Beggars of Tehran  - 1966
 Runaway from the Paradise  - 1974
 Window  - 1988
 Lovers  - 1991

References

External links
 

1923 births
1991 deaths
Iranian male television actors
Iranian male film actors
Iranian male stage actors
Male actors from Tehran